Ben Dixon (born 14 June 1977) is a former professional Australian rules footballer who played for the Hawthorn Football Club in the Australian Football League (AFL). He was the selected by Hawthorn at pick number 77 as a fifth round selection in the 1994 national draft.

AFL career
He debuted in 1997 and kicked 282 goals as a forward including a goal to win the game after the siren against  in round 17, 2001.

Dixon retired at the end of the 2007 season.

Post-football career
After retiring, he appeared on Future Stars and as a commentator for Fox Footy.

In 2017, Dixon joined  as their goalkicking coach.

Personal life

His father, Joe Dixon, played a handful of games with the Fitzroy Football Club in 1963.

External links

Hawthorn Football Club players
Yarrawonga Football Club players
Australian rules footballers from Victoria (Australia)
1977 births
Living people
Australian rules football commentators